An Irish bull is a ludicrous, incongruent or logically absurd statement, generally unrecognized as such by its author. The inclusion of the epithet Irish is a late addition.

The "Irish bull" is to the sense of a statement what the dangling participle is to the syntax, or, in other words, a jarring or amusing absurdity is created by hastiness or lack of attention to speech or writing.

Although, strictly speaking, Irish bulls are so structured semantically as to be logically meaningless, their actual effect upon listeners is usually to give vivid illustrations to obvious truths. Hence, as John Pentland Mahaffy, Provost of Trinity College, Dublin, famously observed, "an Irish bull is always pregnant", i.e. with truthful meaning.
The "father" of the Irish bull is often said to be Sir Boyle Roche,
who once asked "Why should we put ourselves out of our way to do anything for posterity, for what has posterity ever done for us?". Roche may have been Sheridan's model for Mrs Malaprop.

Yogi Berra and Samuel Goldwyn were famous American mis-speakers. 

The Irish bull can be a potent form of self-conscious equivocation and satire. As such, it is associated particularly with new or marginalized populations, such as the Irish in Britain in the nineteenth century, or the Jews and Germans in America in the early twentieth century.

Origin 
The derivation of "bull" in this sense is unclear. It may be related to Old French boul "fraud, deceit, trickery", Icelandic bull "nonsense", Middle English bull "falsehood", or the verb bull "befool, mock, cheat".

The Irish were supposedly peculiarly prone to such expressions due to their volubility, their taste for colourful metaphors, and their ignorance (or conversely excessive command) of the English language. American Jewish humorists have made extensive use of Irish bulls, dating from the period when large numbers of recent Jewish immigrants from Germany or Eastern Europe were present in American cities.  This suggests that a similar effect produced the term "Irish bull", which is partly contemptuous and partly homage.

However, as the Oxford English Dictionary points out, the epithet "Irish" is a more recent addition, the original word bull for such nonsense having been traced back at least to the early 17th century. By the late 19th century the expression Irish bull was well known, but writers were expressing reservations such as: "But it is a cruel injustice to poor Paddy to speak of the genuine 'bull' as something distinctly Irish, when countless examples of the same kind of blunder, not a whit less startling, are to be found elsewhere." The passage continues, presenting Scottish, English and French specimens in support.

Examples
"He'll regret it till his dying day, if ever he lives that long." – "Red" Will Danaher, in The Quiet Man
"If I could drop dead right now, I'd be the happiest man alive." – Samuel Goldwyn, movie producer (1882–1974)
"Always go to other people's funerals, otherwise they won't come to yours." – Yogi Berra, baseball player (1925–2015)
"I'll cut off'n yer 'ead an' throw it in yer face." – Brian Jacques, Martin the Warrior
"There’ll be people dying in this town who’ve never f---ing died before" – Belfast taxi driver

See also

Footnotes

Other references
 
 

Word play
Semantics
Ethnic humour
Bull